The Apple Intermediate Codec is a high-quality 8-bit 4:2:0 video codec used mainly as a less processor-intensive way of working with long-GOP MPEG-2 footage such as HDV. It is recommended for use with all HD workflows in Final Cut Express, iMovie, and until Final Cut Pro version 5. The Apple Intermediate Codec abbreviated AIC (by users, Apple Engineers don't use the abbreviation) is designed by Apple Inc. to be an intermediate format in an HDV and AVCHD workflow. It features high performance and quality, being less processor intensive to work with than other editing formats. Unlike native MPEG-2 based HDV - and similar to the standard-definition DV codec - the Apple Intermediate Codec does not use temporal compression, enabling every frame to be decoded immediately without decoding other frames. As a result of this, the Apple Intermediate Codec takes three to four times more space than HDV.

The Apple Intermediate Codec is officially available only on the Mac OS X platform but can be read on other platforms such as Windows or Linux, using FFmpeg. All Mac OS X software which makes use of the QuickTime codec libraries - such as Final Cut Studio, Final Cut Express, and iMovie - can use the Apple Intermediate codec.

The Apple Intermediate Codec was used because it was less processor intensive; as the compression scheme did not need the next frame to be displayed. It's still used in the iLife package, specifically iMovie, but it is rarely used in Final Cut Pro as of Version 6 since it now uses the ProRes codecs instead of the Apple Intermediate Codec, though some versions of Final Cut Pro (HD 4.5 through 5) and Final Cut Express use them regularly.

About HDV 

HDV (High Definition Video) is a video format that allows you to record HD video in standard DV tape. Its compression scheme is called long-GOP MPEG2. HDV is an HD format created by a consortium of manufacturers including Sony, JVC, Canon, and Sharp. HDV allows you to record an hour of HD video on standard mini-DV videocassettes. You can connect an HDV camcorder to your computer via FireWire, so you can capture and output just as you would with a DV device.

It uses Long-GOP MPEG2 compression to achieve a maximum data rate of 25mps, which is the same as normal DV video. This standard yields extremely High Definition images in shorter space. The term long refers to the fact that P- and B-frames are used between I-frame intervals. At the other end of the spectrum, the opposite of long-GOP MPEG is I-frame-only MPEG, in which only I-frames are used. Formats such as IMX use I-frame-only MPEG, which reduces temporal artifacts and improves editing performance. However, I-frame-only formats have a significantly higher data rate because each frame must store enough data to be completely self-contained. Therefore, although the decoding demands on your computer are decreased, there is a greater demand for scratch disk speed and capacity.

1080-line HDV media uses an open GOP structure, which means that B-frames in the MPEG stream can be reliant on frames in adjacent GOPs. 720-line HDV media uses a closed GOP structure, which means that each GOP is self-contained and does not rely on frames outside the GOP.

About MPEG compression 

HD video requires significantly more data than SD video. A single HD video frame can require up to six times more data than an SD frame. To record such large images with such a low data rate, HDV uses long-GOP MPEG compression. MPEG compression reduces the data rate by removing redundant visual information, both on a per-frame basis and also across multiple frames.

Note: HDV specifically employs MPEG-2 compression, but the concepts of long-GOP and I-frame-only compression discussed below apply to all versions of the MPEG standard: MPEG-1, MPEG-2, and MPEG-4 (including AVC/H.264). For the purposes of this general explanation, the term MPEG may refer to any of these formats.

About AVCHD 

AVCHD is an HD video format jointly developed by Sony and Panasonic. AVCHD uses Advanced Video Coding (AVC) compression (also known as MPEG-4 part 10 or H.264) to achieve high-quality images and low data rates. AVCHD camcorders record on a variety of file-based media, including 80 mm DVDs, hard disks, and flash memory (such as Secure Digital cards and memory sticks).

The AVCHD specification allows most SD and HD dimensions and frame rates, though each camcorder usually supports only a few formats. The AVCHD color sample ratio is 4:2:0, with 8 bits per sample. Audio can be recorded in 5.1-channel surround sound with Dolby Digital (AC-3) compression or up to 7.1-channel surround sound (uncompressed). Some camcorders, such as the Panasonic HDC-SD5 camcorder, use a two-channel built-in microphone.

Color recording method 

Both MPEG-2 HDV, AVCHD and the Apple Intermediate Codec record a 4:2:0 component (Y´CBCR) digital video signal. Each sample (pixel) has a resolution of 8 bit. This is not much of a concern for editors as HDV and AVCHD records in a 4:2:0 color space anyway. In fact you may actually lose data if you decide to use 4:2:2 codecs like DVCPRO HD

Frame aspect ratios 

MPEG-2 HDV and Apple Intermediate Codec feature a 16:9 widescreen aspect ratio for all resolutions.

The 1080i format features 1080 lines (1440 pixels per line), interlaced, using non-square pixels to display a screen ratio of 16:9 (equivalent to 1920 x 1080). The 720p format features 720 lines (equivalent to 1280 x 720) with a progressive scan.

AVCHD factor 

AVCHD uses H.264 for video compression and AAC for audio. This is even more processor intensive than HDV. So you also need to convert to the Apple Intermediate Codec if you plan to edit in Final Cut Pro.

Format details

References 
 About HDV - Final Cut Pro Studio Help
 Final Cut Pro 7 Professional Formats and Workflows

External links 
 Final Cut Pro 7 Professional Formats and Workflows: About the Apple Intermediate Codec
 Final Cut Pro 5: About HDV and the Apple Intermediate Codec
 Final Cut Pro 7 Professional Formats and Workflows 

Intermediate Codec
Video codecs